Mansion is the debut studio album by American rapper NF, released on March 31, 2015 on Capitol CMG.

Critical reception

David Jeffries, giving the album four stars at AllMusic, writes, "the rapper deliver the goods on this awesome debut." Signaling in a four star review by CCM Magazine, Grace S. Aspinwall realizes, "Raw, gritty, and enigmatic, this project from the ultra-talented newcomer NF, is an impressive effort", and calls NF "an artist to watch, and brilliance is sure to follow this beautiful, sometimes dark, and vulnerable project." Specifying in a five star review for Jesus Freak Hideout, Kevin Hoskins responds, "The only downfall here will be that some people aren't impressed by such raw, personal, and emotionally-driven rap, but that's exactly what makes this stand out among so many rap albums out today... This has 'album of the year' written all over it." Steve Hayes, delivering a ten out of ten review at Cross Rhythms, regards this as, "unquestionably one of the finest ever to emerge from the gospel hip-hop scene."

Commercial performance 
Mansion debuted at No. 62 on the Billboard 200 selling 10,169 copies in the first week. By October 2017, the album had sold 136,000 copies in the United States.

Track listing

Charts

Certifications

References

2015 debut albums
NF (rapper) albums